Raul di Orlando Barbosa Mendes (born 14 August 2000), simply known as Raul or sometimes Raulzinho, is a Brazilian professional footballer who plays as a forward for Remo.

Club career
Born in Jangada, Mato Grosso, Raul was a Cuiabá youth graduate. He made his first team debut on 15 August 2019, coming on as a late substitute for Hugo Cabral in a 0–1 home loss against Iporá, for the year's Copa Verde, and also missed his penalty in the 6–5 shoot-out win.

On 23 September 2020, after being rarely used, Raul was loaned to Fortaleza and returned to the youth setup. Upon returning, he started to feature more regularly in the 2021 Campeonato Mato-Grossense, being a regular starter before suffering a minor injury in March 2021.

On 1 May 2021, Raul renewed his contract with the Dourado until the end of 2023.

Career statistics

Honours

Cuiabá
Copa Verde: 2019

Remo
Campeonato Paraense: 2022

References

External links

2000 births
Living people
Sportspeople from Mato Grosso
Brazilian footballers
Association football forwards
Cuiabá Esporte Clube players
Clube do Remo players